Bennett University is a private university  located near Sector XU-3, Greater Noida in Uttar Pradesh, India. Founded in 2016 by Times of India Group and established under Uttar Pradesh Act No. 24 of 2016, the university has a fully residential 68-acre campus, near the proposed metro station on the Noida-Greater Noida metro railway line.

Administration
The chancellor of the university is Vineet Jain and vice-chancellor is Prabhu Aggarwal.

Bennett University is administered by its Academic Council, and Planning Board.

Academic Structure and Admission
The university has 5 schools and 2 centres on its campus. It offers Undergraduate, Post graduate and PhD programs in the areas of Engineering, Management, Law, and Media. The medium of instruction is English.

School of Engineering and Applied Sciences
The School of Engineering and Applied Sciences (SEAS) offers B. Tech.  Admission is based on either JEE Main or SAT scores for all applicants.

SEAS also offers PhD programs in all its disciplines. The admission to PhD program is held through a written and interview based admission test held twice a year.

The school has departments such as Computer Science Engineering, Mechanical & Aerospace Engineering, and Biotechnology

School of Management
The School of Management offers BBA and MBA programs.

School of Law
The School of Law offers courses in law at undergraduate, postgraduate, diploma, and doctoral levels: It is currently ranked 387th nation-wide.

Times School of Media and Mass Communication
The Times School of Media and Mass Communication is an interdisciplinary professional school and offers the courses at undergraduate, diploma, and doctoral levels:

School of Liberal Arts

Center for Innovation and Entrepreneurship (CIE) 
CIE in collaboration with Babson College, United States fosters an environment of innovation and entrepreneurship. The partnership has set up 'The Bennett Hatchery", the on-campus incubator, which provides physical space, funding, training, mentoring and resources needed to start their projects.

Center of Executive Education 
The Center of Executive Education offers executive programs primarily focused towards personal and professional development of industry personnel.

Student Clubs & Societies
University has an active student life and provides ample opportunities to students with varied interests to participate in different activities and events organized by these clubs from time to time. A few clubs active are Alexis Club, Nomads club, Astronomy club, ISSAC club, Robotics Club, BU Pulse, SPIC MACAY among others.

Campus
The Bennett University has a completely residential 68 acre campus in Greater Noida, Uttar Pradesh.

The campus contains administrative and academic blocks (consisting of classrooms and labs), girls and boys hostels, and sports facility.

It has a supercomputer (NVIDIA), purchased through a MoU between School of Engineering and Applied Sciences and NVIDIA.

References

Private universities in Uttar Pradesh
Universities and colleges in Noida
Educational institutions established in 2016
2016 establishments in Uttar Pradesh